The Yeh-Shyr-Tau Literary Memorial Museum is a memorial hall dedicated to Yeh Shih-tao in West Central District, Tainan, Taiwan.

History
The building where the memorial hall is housed today used to be the Tainan Forestry Affairs Office. In 2002, the building was designed as historical building by Tainan City Government. The building was then converted into Yeh Shih-tao Literature Memorial Hall which was opened on 11 August 2012 by the Bureau of Cultural Affairs of the city government to commemorate and pay tribute to Yeh Shih-tao, a Tainan-born Taiwanese literature legend and writer. The opening ceremony was attended by Tainan Mayor William Lai.

Architecture
The building has two floors. The first floor consists of the main exhibition floor, displaying Yeh's commemorative souvenirs. The second floor consists of the restoration of his room and a little theater showing the introduction of him and his accomplishments.

Transportation
The building is accessible within walking distance south west of Tainan Station of Taiwan Railways.

See also
 List of tourist attractions in Taiwan

References

2012 establishments in Taiwan
Buildings and structures in Tainan
Tourist attractions in Tainan